Karen Elena Jordán Beitia, (born 28 January 1989), David, Chiriquí Province, is a Panamanian model and beauty pageant contestant winner of the Miss International Panamá 2012 title on March 30, 2012, for Miss International 2012 contest.

Beauty pageant participations 
Participated in the Panamanian beauty pageant Miss Mundo Panamá 2010 where she managed to stand as one of the finalists.

She was also a participant of the Chica AVON COXMETICS 2010 beauty pageant.

She also represented Panamá in the regional beauty pageant Reinado Internacional del Café 2011 in Manizales, Colombia.

In 2011 won the Miss Asia Pacific Panamá title, the contest took place in Korea. She won the talent competition.

Miss Panamá 2012

At the end of the Miss Panamá 2012 she also received awards including Miss Best Body Power Club.

Jordán is 5 ft 9 in (1.75 m) tall, and competed in the national beauty pageant Miss Panamá 2012. She represented the state of Chiriquí.

Miss International

She represented Panamá in the 2012 Miss International pageant, held on Chengdu, China on November, 2012.

See also
 Miss Panamá 2012
 Ana Ibáñez

References

External links
Panamá 2012 official website
Miss Panamá
Miss Panamá blogspot

1989 births
Living people
Panamanian beauty pageant winners
Panamanian female models
Miss International 2012 delegates
Señorita Panamá